Brian Elliott Hayden FRSC (born July 1954) has been Professor of Physical Chemistry within Chemistry at the University of Southampton since 1995.

He graduated with a BSc in 1976 and a PhD in 1979 from the University of Bristol. He was a postdoctoral fellow at the Fritz Haber Institute of the Max Planck Society from 1979 to 1984 developing surface sensitive optical spectroscopies, including ellipsometry and reflection absorption infra-red spectroscopy, for the investigation of adsorbed molecules on single crystal surfaces. He was a lecturer at the University of Bath from 1984 to 1988, developing supersonic molecular beam techniques to study reaction dynamics at single crystal metal surfaces.

He is a Fellow of the Royal Society of Chemistry and Fellow of the Institute of Physics, has an h-index of 38, and is the author of over 18 active patent families including new catalysts and materials for low temperature fuel cells and solid state Li-ion batteries. He is a founder and Chief Scientific Officer of Ilika plc, a pioneer in solid-state battery technology.

References

1954 births
Living people
Alumni of the University of Bristol
Academics of the University of Bath
Academics of the University of Southampton
Fellows of the Royal Society of Chemistry
Fellows of the Institute of Physics
British physical chemists